The Asheville Tourists are a Minor League Baseball team of the South Atlantic League and the High-A affiliate of the Houston Astros. They are located in Asheville, North Carolina.

Asheville teams have played under the Tourists moniker in different leagues and classifications for over a century, with the earliest dating to 1897. The current team has played continuously in what is now known as the South Atlantic League since 1976, though it was briefly known as the High-A East in 2021. Asheville has  won three South Atlantic league championships, first in 1984 and most recently in 2014. Previous Tourists teams won a total of four additional championships.

The Tourists play home games at McCormick Field. The park opened in 1924, renovated in 1959, and renovated again for the 1992 season. McCormick Field seats 4,000 fans, and is notable for the scoreboard which reads "Visitors" in the guest slot and "Tourists" in the home slot.

History

Earlier teams
Professional baseball in Asheville, North Carolina, dates to 1897, when the Asheville Moonshiners took the field. It has been played continuously for nearly every year since 1909, with early teams such as the Redbirds (1909) and the Mountaineers (1910–1914). The "Tourists" name dates to 1915, when local sportswriters began referring to the Mountaineers team as the Tourists.

The original Tourists brought Asheville its first ever professional sports championship in 1915. They continued playing in the Class-D North Carolina State League until 1917, when the league suspended operations due to World War I. In 1924 the "Asheville Skylanders" started play in the South Atlantic League; however, they soon adopted the Tourists nickname. They played in the South Atlantic League until 1930, when they jumped to the Piedmont League, where they played for two seasons before folding. In 1934 the Columbia Sandlappers moved to Asheville, taking up the Tourists name. This incarnation won the 1939 Piedmont League championship; however the league suspended operations in 1942, due to the outset of World War II.

In 1946 a new Tourists franchise started up in the Tri-State League. During the 1940s they shared McCormick Field with the Asheville Blues, an independent Negro leagues team. They folded along with their league in 1955. In 1959 a new South Atlantic League (later the Southern League) franchise came to town. McCormick Field was renovated. The team initially wanted a new name, and organized a fan vote to pick. However, fans voted overwhelmingly to keep the Tourists nickname. The team won two league titles, in 1961 and 1968. In 1968, the Tourists won the Southern League championship under manager Sparky Anderson, who went on to manage the Cincinnati Reds and Detroit Tigers during his 26 years in Major League Baseball.

In 1972 Asheville became affiliated with the Baltimore Orioles MLB team. As part of Baltimore's "Oriole Way" system, the Asheville team was rebranded the Asheville Orioles, adopting the logo and colors of their affiliate. The team had four successive winning seasons, but after the 1975 season the Orioles relocated their Double-A franchise to Charlotte, North Carolina, as the Charlotte Orioles.

Current team

McCormick Field would not be unoccupied for the 1976 season, however. Shortly after the AA franchise moved to Charlotte, their place was taken by an expansion team in the Western Carolinas League (which in 1980 became the South Atlantic League). Like many teams before it, it assumed the Tourists nickname. The team has remained in Asheville continuously since, winning the 1984 league championship. They are currently a farm team of the Houston Astros (1982–93, 2021-), with whom they have been affiliated since 2021. They were previously affiliated with the Texas Rangers (1976–81) and the Colorado Rockies (1994-2020).  The team has subsequently won two additional league titles in 2012 and 2014.

The Tourists played a minor role in the 1988 film Bull Durham. In the film Kevin Costner's character, Crash Davis, finishes his baseball career with the Tourists after being cut from the Durham Bulls, and with them breaks the all-time minor league home run record. The Tourists' fan store features "Crash Davis" jerseys and paraphernalia in remembrance of its cameo in filmography. 

In conjunction with Major League Baseball's restructuring of Minor League Baseball in 2021, the Tourists were organized into the High-A East. In 2022, the High-A East became known as the South Atlantic League, the name historically used by the regional circuit prior to the 2021 reorganization.

Ownership
On January 5, 2010 it was reported by the Asheville Citizen-Times that Palace Sports and Entertainment have sold the Asheville Tourists to former U.S. Senator and current Governor of Ohio Mike DeWine and his family. It was reported that Brian DeWine, son of Mike, would be the team president. The team is owned by DeWine Seeds-Silver Dollar Baseball. Governor DeWine has a 32% stake in the team but does not play a role in management. In 2020 the team received a $189,500 Paycheck Protection Program loan during the COVID-19 pandemic.

Roster

Notable alumni

Baseball Hall of Fame alumni 
 Sparky Anderson (1968, Manager) Inducted, 2000
 Craig Biggio (1987)  Inducted, 2015
 Eddie Murray (1974)   Inducted, 2003
 Willie Stargell (1961)  Inducted, 1988
 Billy Southworth (1935–1936, Player/Manager) Inducted, 2008

Notable alumni

Larry Gardner (1925–1926, Player/Manager)
 Johnny Allen (1929) MLB All-Star
 Mort Cooper (1936) 4 x MLB All-Star; 1942 NL Most Valuable Player
Walker Cooper (1939) 8 x MLB All-Star
 Clem Labine (1947) 2 x MLB All-Star
 Gene Alley (1961–62) MLB All-Star
 Bob Lee (1961)  MLB All-Star
 Steve Blass (1962) MLB All-Star
Bob Lee (1965)  MLB All-Star
 Dave Roberts (1964)
 Doc Ellis (1966) MLB All-Star
 Fred Patek (1966) MLB All-Star
 Dave Concepcion (1969) MLB All-Star
 Larry Sherry (1971)  1959 World Series MVP
 Al Bumbry (1972) MLB All-Star; 1973 AL Rookie of the Year
 Doug DeCinces (1973)  MLB All-Star
 Mike Flanagan(1974) MLB All-Star; 1979 AL Cy Young winner
 Rich Dauer (1974–75) 
 Tom Henke (1981) MLB All-Star
 Luis Gonzalez (1988)  MLB All-Star
 Kenny Lofton (1989) MLB All-Star
 Shane Reynolds (1989) MLB All-Star
 Bobby Abreu (1992)  MLB All-Star
 Melvin Mora (1993) MLB All-Star
 Todd Helton (1995)  MLB All-Star
 Matt Holliday (1999) MLB All-Star
 Ubaldo Jiménez (2003) MLB All-Star
 Dexter Fowler (2006) MLB All-Star
 Brian Fuentes (2007)  MLB All-Star
 Nolan Arenado (2010)  MLB All-Star
 Russell Wilson (2011)  NFL Super Bowl Champion
 Trevor Story (2012)  MLB All-Star

Season-by-season records

References

External links
 Official site

Baseball teams established in 1915
South Atlantic League teams
Southern League (1964–present) teams
Carolina League teams
Sports in Asheville, North Carolina
Professional baseball teams in North Carolina
Colorado Rockies minor league affiliates
Texas Rangers minor league affiliates
Brooklyn Dodgers minor league affiliates
St. Louis Cardinals minor league affiliates
Cincinnati Reds minor league affiliates
Boston Red Sox minor league affiliates
Philadelphia Phillies minor league affiliates
Pittsburgh Pirates minor league affiliates
Chicago White Sox minor league affiliates
Houston Astros minor league affiliates
Baltimore Orioles minor league affiliates
1915 establishments in North Carolina
Southeastern League (1897) teams
South Atlantic League (1904–1963) teams
High-A East teams
Defunct Western Carolinas League teams
Piedmont League teams